Stadelheim may refer to:
 Stadelheim Prison in Munich's Giesing district
 Cell 70 of Stadelheim Prison
 Stadelheim Transmitter, a medium-wave broadcast transmitter in Munich-Stadelheim, built 1926 and last used around 1933

de:Stadelheim